The Comical History of Don Quixote is a three-part dramatization of Miguel de Cervantes's celebrated novel Don Quixote. It was written in 1694, only seventy-eight years after the death of Cervantes, by Thomas D'Urfey. It is one of the first stage dramatizations of "Don Quixote" ever written. The piece featured many songs, most of them by Henry Purcell, but there were some by other noted Restoration composers. A highly-abridged early revival of it (with full orchestral accompaniment) took place at the 1938 Bath Music Festival.

The complete work itself, according to writer-director Don Taylor, is actually three separate plays, and in total takes more than seven hours to perform. It is seldom, if ever, revived today, and was not a success at its premiere, although some of Purcell's compositions for it (From rosy bow'rs, for instance) have become fairly well known. In 1994, an attempt was made at "reconstructing" it, in a version entitled Don Quixote: The Musical. This edition featured much of the play's original music, but used an entirely new libretto (in fairly modern English) written by Taylor, and setting the story as a play within a play, with D'Urfey and others appearing as characters in it. The production starred Paul Scofield as Don Quixote, and Roy Hudd as Sancho Panza.

References

External links
 The Comical History of Don Quixote, full text of the first edition at Early English Books Online.

1694 plays
Plays based on Don Quixote